Kenneth Ervin Owen (September 1, 1918 – January 23, 2001) was an American politician from the state of Iowa.

Early life 
On September 1, 1918, Owen was born in Jerome, Iowa, U.S. Owen's parents were Samuel and Vera (née Sedgwick) Owen. Owen attended Centerville High School in Centerville.

Career 
Owen was a farmer in Jerome, Iowa.
Owen served as a Democrat in the 4th district of the Iowa House of Representatives for three terms from 1955 to 1961, and for one term as the Secretary of Agriculture of Iowa from 1965 to 1967. Owen also served on the Appanoose County Farm Bureau Board and on the Jerome School Board.

Personal life 
In 1937, Owen married Frances Hamm. Owen had two children, Diana (née Owen) Glenn and Keith Owen.
In 2001, Owen died in Jerome, Iowa. Owen is interred in Jerome Cemetery, Jerome, Iowa.

References

|-

1918 births
2001 deaths
People from Appanoose County, Iowa
Farmers from Iowa
School board members in Iowa
Democratic Party members of the Iowa House of Representatives
Secretaries of Agriculture of Iowa
20th-century American politicians